Portugal Tem Talento was the second Portuguese version of the Got Talent series and spiritual successor to the older version "Aqui Há Talento" (aired on RTP1 in 2007). It debuted on SIC on January 30, 2011. Singers, dancers, comedians, variety acts, and other performers are competing for the prize of €100,000. It is hosted by Bárbara Guimarães. The judges are Diogo Quintela, Conceição Lino and Ricardo Pais.

External links

Portuguese-language television shows
2011 Portuguese television series debuts
Portuguese reality television series
Got Talent
Television series by Fremantle (company)
Portuguese television series based on British television series